The London Senior Hurling Championship is a Gaelic Athletic Association cup competition between the top hurling clubs in London, England.

Top winners

Roll of honour

References

Hurling competitions in the United Kingdom
Senior
Senior Hurling
Senior hurling county championships